Stephen, Steven, or Steve Wagner may refer to:

Stephen Wagner (born 1977), Canadian ice hockey goaltender
Steve Wagner (American football) (born 1954), NFL football defensive back
Steve Wagner (field hockey) (born 1967), American Olympic field hockey goalkeeper 
Steve Wagner (ice hockey) (born 1984), American ice hockey defenceman 
Steve Wagner (writer), American co-author of Ordinary Heroes
Steve Wagner (brewer), American brewer and founder of Stone Brewing Co.